Krassimir Terziev (born 1969) is a Bulgarian visual artist, living and working in Sofia. He works with a broad range of media including video, photography, installation and drawing.

Education 
Terziev was born in Dobritch, Bulgaria. He received a Ph.D. in cultural anthropology at Sofia University (2012), and is teaching in the Digital Arts MA Programme at the National Academy of Arts Sofia (abbreviated НХА, NAA), where he received an MA in painting in 1997.

Exhibitions 
His solo exhibitions include: Background Action, Würtembergischer Kunstverein Stuttgart, 2008, Sofia City Gallery, 2007; Making Movies, Galleria Noua, Bucharest, 2007; Remote Resemblances, Goethe-Institut Sofia, 2005; Excuse Me, Which City Is This?, Institute of Contemporary Art - Sofia, 2004; On The BG Track,  Belgrade Cultural Centre, 2003; Everything Seems Alright, The Kitchen, New York, 1999.
His work has been exhibited in group exhibitions, including: Actors&Extras, Argos Centre for Art and Media, Brussels, 2009, The Projection Project, MuHKA, Antwerp, 2007, Műcsarnok Kunsthalle Budapest, 2007; Cinema like never before, Generali Foundation, Vienna, 2006, Akademie der Künste, Berlin, 2007; New Video, New Europe, TATE Modern London, 2004, Stedelijk Museum, Amsterdam, 2005, Renaissance Society, Chicago, 2004, The Kitchen, NY, 2005.

Books 
 Terziev, Krassimir. Between the Past That is About to Happen and the Future That has Already Been. Sofia: Iztok-Zapad, 2015.
 Terziev, Krassimir. Recomposition. Author, Media and Artwork in the Age of Digital Reproduction. Sofia: Iztok-Zapad & ICA-Sofia, 2012,.
 Terziev, Krassimir. Extra Work: Taking the figure of the extra in cinema as a metaphor. Stuttgart: merz&solitude, Reihe Projektiv, 2008, 
 A Gaze for the Pale City, Visual Seminar, 2, Sofia: Revolver, 2004, .

References

External links 
 Krassimir Terziev official website
 Background Action exhibition, WKV-Stuttgart
 Artnews.org
 Seminar_BG. Journal for Cultural Studies
 Bidoun, 13, Winter 2007

Contemporary artists
Bulgarian photographers
1969 births
Living people
Video artists
Installation artists
20th-century Bulgarian artists
20th-century photographers
21st-century Bulgarian artists
21st-century photographers